Olivotti may refer to:

 A trading name of interior designers Piero Malacrida de Saint-August and his wife Nadja Malacrida
 The Olivotti Troubadours, featuring Roy Butin and Michael Banner
 a 1916 United States legal case, United States v. Olivotti
 Olivotti Lake; see List of lakes in Wisconsin

See also 

 Olivetti